Nygolaimellidae is a family of nematodes belonging to the order Dorylaimida.

Genera:
 Nygolaimellus Loos, 1949
 Nygolaimium Thorne, 1930
 Scapidens Heyns, 1965

References

Nematodes